The Battle of Hadiya was fought between the forces of the Hadiya led by their Garad (chief) Aze, and the Ethiopian Empire under Emperor Sarsa Dengel. The Hadiya ruler had refused to pay tribute to the Ethiopian emperor, which lead to the conflict. Emir Uthman of Harar dispatched 500 Malassay warriors donned in cuirasses to assist Hadiya however Aze's own men, who were large in number, refused to fight the invading Ethiopian army. Hadiya soldiers cited their refusal as being due to already having sustained heavy casualties during the Oromo migrations. The Malassay of Harar, finding themselves alone in battle, were thus easily defeated by the Ethiopian forces.

References

Hadiya